is a 1981 Japanese film directed by Masaru Konuma and starring Maiko Kazama. It is the third film in the four part "The Woman Who ..." series which Nikkatsu produced in 1981-1982 as part of their Roman porno series to showcase the talents of Maiko Kazama as a successor to Naomi Tani who had retired in 1979.

Synopsis
Toriko is a sexually frustrated wife who gets involved in swapping games with her neighbors.

Cast
 Maiko Kazama as Toriko Kano
 Izumi Shima as Teruyo Yoshida
 Rie Kitahara as Yoshiko Arishima
 Baku Numata as Makoto Kano
 Rika Takahara

Awards
3rd Yokohama Film Festival
Won: Best Actress - Maiko Kazama

References

External links
 
 

1981 films
Films directed by Masaru Konuma
Nikkatsu Roman Porno
Nikkatsu films
Japanese pornographic films
1980s Japanese films